Justice Daniel Francis Kweipe Annan (November 7, 1928 – July 16, 2006) was Speaker of the Parliament of Ghana from 1993 to 2001. He was a  member of the Provisional National Defence Council government which governed Ghana prior the fourth republic and was Chairman of the National Commission for Democracy.

Early life
Daniel Annan was born in Accra, Ghana on November 7, 1928, to Ga-Adangbe parents.  
His father, Victor Benjamin Annan was a merchant and treasurer of the Accra branch of the United Gold Coast Convention, while his mother was Mary Nyaniba Annan. 
Annan's maternal great-grandfather was the King of Gã State (known locally as Gã Maŋtsɛ) Tackie Tawia I of Accra, who reigned from 1862 to 1902.
 
He started his education at the primary section of King's College, Lagos, receiving his Kindergarten education. He had his secondary education at Accra Academy from 1939 to 1945. Thereafter, he studied at the intermediate department at Achimota College from 1946 to 1948. Justice Annan then proceeded to the United Kingdom to study law at the University of Hull. He obtained the LL.B (Hons) degree in 1956 while there. He was called to the bar at the Middle Temple, UK, in 1958.

Career
Justice Annan worked at the Attorney General's department in Accra, Ghana from 1958 to 1964. He rose from Assistant State Attorney, through State Attorney and finally worked as Senior State Attorney during that period. He joined the bench in 1964 as a Circuit Court Judge for two years. He was promoted High Court Judge in 1966 and then Appeal Court Judge in 1971. He served as the Stool Lands Boundaries Settlement Commissioner and also as a Member of the Legal Class Appointment Board from 1974 to 1976. Other positions held by Daniel Annan include Chairman of the Press Freedom and Complaints Committee of the Ghana Press Commission in 1980  and Chairman of the Ghana Police Council in 1984 as well as chairman, National Economic Commission in 1984.

Politics and Speaker of Parliament
Daniel Annan was appointed a member of the ruling Provisional National Defence Council (PNDC) in 1984. He effectively became the deputy to Jerry Rawlings, the Head of state of Ghana and acted quite often when Rawlings was out of the country. The government also made him Chairman of the National Commission for Democracy in 1984 which was to oversee preparations to return Ghana back to democracy. On the inauguration of the fourth republic, Justice Annan was elected Speaker of Parliament in January 1993, a position he held during the second parliament of the fourth republic as well till 2001. During this period, he got to act as President of Ghana when both the President and Vice President were out of the country.

Sports
Justice Annan loved sports. He was Chairman of the  Ghana Boxing Promotion Syndicate from 1973 to 1976 and Chairman of the Ghana Boxing Authority from 1980 to 1982. He was also President of the Ghana National Olympic Committee (1983–1985).

Honours
 Star of Ghana - one of the prestigious state awards.

Death
Daniel Annan died on July 16, 2006, in Accra after a period of illness.

Literature

Notes

External links
Profile on Ghanaweb.com
Ghanaweb Photo Report on Justice Annan
Last respects to Justice Annan - Photo Report

1928 births
2006 deaths
20th-century Ghanaian judges
Speakers of the Parliament of Ghana
Alumni of the University of Hull
Alumni of the Accra Academy
Alumni of Achimota School
People from Accra
Ga-Adangbe people
Ghanaian Methodists